The Grudge Match is a 1991 syndicated television game show that invited feuding people to settle their issues in a boxing ring using various implements of revenge.

The show was presided over by Steve Albert and Jesse "The Body" Ventura, with Albert calling the action and Ventura as the colour commentator. Michael Buffer was the ring announcer and comedian John Pinette refereed the bouts. Then-Entertainment Tonight correspondent Paula McClure served as a reporter.

The Grudge Match later was revived for British television, with Nick Weir and Lisa Rogers hosting and boxer Barry McGuigan as the referee.

US version

Format
Each Grudge Match featured two people with a grievance to air out. A short video explaining the beef was played before each match. Each participant wore a uniform consisting of a helmet, T-shirt, shorts, and Chuck Taylor All-Stars of the same colour. One contestant wore red while the other blue. Prior to the bout, the competitors chose which of the implements they wanted to use during the three round match.

Each Grudge Match had a title attached to it, relating to the grudge being carried. Both fighters were introduced with a nickname by Buffer, and Pinette explained the rules before each bout.

Since the match took place in a boxing ring, it was treated as a boxing match. Each round was only one minute long, however (as opposed to three). Only the referee could stop the fight, and the standard 8-count rule in boxing applied. After three rounds, the audience voted for the winner, which was announced by Buffer.

Examples of challenges

Batakas
The two opponents try to get as many hits on each other's heads as possible with batakas. In some cases, to level the playing field due to the strength differences in the opponents, one opponent may have his or her shoes tied together and/or only have one bataka, while the other would have his or her shoes tied individually and have two batakas.

Boxing gloves
The contestants fight with oversized boxing gloves; standard boxing rules apply.

Baker's dozen
The two opponents have 60 seconds to throw as many stale doughnuts as possible and try to get the most hits.

Salad bar
The two opponents have 60 seconds to pelt each other with food items used in a salad bar.

Cavemen
The two contestants are dressed as cavemen and have 3 minutes to pelt one another with clubs.

Ending
The two opponents after the match (and sometimes interviews from Ventura) would hug or give a handshake to one another, and the winner got a bonus prize.

British version
From 4 September 1999 to 15 April 2000, London Weekend Television made a British version of Grudge Match (which did not have the word the in its title), hosted by Nick Weir and Lisa Rogers, and featured former boxing champion Barry McGuigan as the referee. Instead of the typical challenges as seen on the US version, the challenges were more made in the style of Gladiators, the show which Grudge Match replaced. The winner got a bonus prize, as in the US version, but the loser had to pay a forfeit. The prizes and forfeits were based on the storylines of the grudge. Occasionally Lisa would talk to audience members who were relatives and/or friends of the contenders prior to hearing about it from the contenders' perspectives. This show also ran just one series on weekends on ITV prime time.

All matches were best two out of three, and all rounds began and ended with a bell unless otherwise specified. Sometimes an airhorn signalled the end.  Male contenders wore red and blue, and female contenders wore green and orange. UKGameshows.com reacted negatively to the version in their review, comparing it negatively in comparison to Gladiators.

Examples of challenges

Dueling Giants
The two contenders are strapped to giant inflatable sumo wrestlers and try to knock each other down.  Barry decides the winner.

Glass Mountain
The two contenders climb up a wall made of glass with rock climbing supports for the feet and try to grab a ball and attach it to a velcro wall. The first to grab 2 balls, attach them, and then ring the bell wins.

Tarzan Swing
The two contenders swing across a pool on a rope and grab a ball to place in a smaller wading pool or container. The first to get 3 balls in the pool wins, and the loser gets dunked in the pool.

Sumo Blitz
The contenders, both wearing specially designed sumo suits so that when they fall, people will have to help them back up, race to be the first to score 5 balls in the correct colour bucket. The contenders are allowed to impede the opponent by pushing or bumping them.

Twango
The two players have a rope attached to their back and must pull on another rope to make their way through the soapsuds covered floor to grab a block and then toss it inside a basket to score. When letting go of the rope whether or not they have a block, they get "twangoed" (rapidly pulled) back to the start. If they drop a block onto the soapy floor, it doesn't count. The first one to score 4 blocks, or whoever has the most blocks when all are exhausted, wins.

Mexican Bean
The two players are placed inside what Barry describes as a "giant, inflatable sausage", which is placed in the pool. They must run back and forth transporting balls from one end to the other, depositing them in an envelope. The trouble is that running back and forth in the inflatable sausage may cause contenders to lose their footing and struggle to keep it. The first to 5 balls wins.

Tightrope Trouble
The players must balance themselves using two tightropes above the pool, holding a ball in their mouths while going back to the other side. The first to transfer 2 balls across to the opposite velcro post wins, and the loser's rope becomes a lot less tight, getting them dunked into the pool (unless they fell into the pool already).

Murderball
Barry tosses a medicine ball into the air and the players wrestle for it, but they cannot bite, punch, or kick, or Barry may disqualify them. Their goal is to place the ball in the scoring pod, and the first to do it twice wins.

Summit
The two players begin in the pool and each have to climb a slide of their corresponding colour, using blocks scattered in the pool to get there. The blocks must stack up neatly to count, although the players can toss the blocks up to the ramp. The first to press the buzzer wins, and when doing so, activates a tank that dumps water onto the loser's slide and flushes away all the losing contender's blocks.

The contenders need not place blocks all the way to the top if they can reach the buzzer.

Dodgem Football
This was only used in a group grudge pitting teams of four against each other. Two players drive bumper cars around while trying to grab a huge ball that Barry throws into the middle of the arena to start to the game. The winner is the team with the most points when time is called, or the team that scores three points first.

Thrash & Splash
The best two of three wins the game. Barry throws a large ball into the pool and the players have to throw it through a hula hoop.

Arena Relay
This game involves the whole team and the whole arena, where the first to complete all four obstacles of the course is the winner, with each player taking on one obstacle. The first players do a swing on a rope over the pool from one net to another, and then cross a section of lily pads without falling in the water to the net. Falling in the water means the player has to go back and start from the second net again. When either player touches the net, the second section begins. A teammate cannot start their job, however, until the previous player finishes theirs.

The second section involves two players dressed in sumo gear (borrowed from the game Sumo Blitz), and the object is to pop five balloons first. The third section starts when one player pops all five.

The third section is crossing on the Twango rope. The players need to grab as many tiles as they can, so the fourth player can climb up the ramp and hit the buzzer to win.

As in Summit, the fourth player uses the tiles to climb up the ramp and hit the buzzer. When they hit the buzzer, their opponent's tiles are all washed away. Completing all four obstacles first wins the point.

Catchphrase
The show began, ended, and led into every commercial break with either Nick or Lisa yelling, "Don't get mad...", and the audience yelling, "GET EVEN!" These words are also the chorus lyrics of the show's theme tune, composed by prolific UK TV composer Paul Farrer, whose other game show music compositions include The Chase and Weakest Link.

Ending
Tradition, like in the US version, states each match must end with a handshake (or sometimes a hug).

External links
The Grudge Match (British) @ pearsontv.com

References

1990s American comedy game shows
1990s American reality television series
1990s British game shows
1991 American television series debuts
1999 British television series debuts
2000s British game shows
2000 British television series endings
First-run syndicated television programs in the United States
Sports entertainment
Television series by 20th Century Fox Television
Jesse Ventura